Revloc Historic District is a national historic district located at Cambria Township in Cambria County, Pennsylvania. The district includes 203 contributing buildings, one contributing site, and one contributing structure.  The district consists of residential areas and utilitarian industrial buildings associated with the Monroe Coal Mining Company and developed between 1917 and 1944.  The mine was serviced by the Cambria and Indiana Railroad.  Notable buildings include a variety of brick and frame miners' housing, stone company store (1918), payroll office (c. 1916), company boiler house (c. 1916), supply house (c. 1918), machine and blacksmith shop (c. 1916), Revloc Presbyterian Church (1923), Most Holy Redeemer Catholic Church (1924), and Revloc School (c. 1919, 1924).

It was listed on the National Register of Historic Places in 1995.

References

External links

Historic American Engineering Record in Pennsylvania
Historic districts on the National Register of Historic Places in Pennsylvania
Historic districts in Cambria County, Pennsylvania
National Register of Historic Places in Cambria County, Pennsylvania